Aphrodite is the Greek goddess for love and beauty

Aphrodite may also refer to:

People
 Afroditi (name), list of people with the name and fictional characters
 Almighty Aphroditey, Swedish drag queen who competed on Drag Race Sverige

Geography and astronomy
 Aphrodite Glacier, Graham Land, Antarctica
 1388 Aphrodite, an asteroid 
 Aphrodite gas field, off the southern coast of Cyprus
 Aphrodite 2, a submarine telecommunications cable system linking Greece and Cyprus

Military
 Operation Aphrodite, a series of drone experiments by the U.S. Army Air Forces during World War II
 USS Aphrodite (SP-135), a U.S. Navy patrol vessel, from 1917 to 1919
 HMS Aphrodite, a cancelled Amphion-class submarine

Books and films
 Aphrodite: mœurs antiques, an 1896 novel by Pierre Louÿs
 Aphrodite LaFonte, in the book series House of Night
 Aphrodite (film), a movie by Robert Fuest very loosely inspired by an episode from the Louÿs novel

Music
 Afro-Dite, a band
 Aphrodite (musician), born Gavin King, a UK jungle and drum and bass DJ/producer
Aphrodite's Theme by George Kotsonis  Love Theme From "The Aphrodite Inheritance" BBC 1979
Aphrodite, composition by George Whitefield Chadwick

Albums
 Aphrodite (Kylie Minogue album), 2010
 Aphrodite (Wink album), 1993
 Aphrodite, 1997 album by Aphrodite (musician) 
 Aphrodite, 2004 album by Ikuko Kawai
 Afrodite, a 2004 album by Imani Coppola

Songs
 "Aphrodite" (song), a 2010 song by Kylie Minogue
"Aphrodite", a song by Ash from Nu-Clear Sounds
"Aphrodite", a song by Kamaliya

Publications
The London Aphrodite, British literary magazine (1928–1929)

See also
 Aphrodita aculeata, the sea mouse, a marine worm named for the goddess Aphrodite
 Aphroditeola, a pink fragrant mushroom genus